David Michael Zastudil (born October 26, 1978) is a former American football punter. He played college football at Ohio, and was drafted in the fourth round of the 2002 NFL Draft by the Baltimore Ravens.

Early years
Zastudil attended Bay High School in Bay Village, Ohio, where he played quarterback, punter, and placekicker and helped to lead his team to an 8–2 record during his senior year.  As a senior, Dave passed for 806 yards and accumulated 2,282 yards throughout his career. He averaged 40.7 yards per kick as a senior punter with a long punt of 67 yards; he also made 19 consecutive point-after attempts, made six field goals with a long field goal of 42 yards and averaged 57 yards per kickoff. He was selected twice as an all-state and all-conference punter, and made the all-district team as a kicker and the all-conference team as a quarterback.

College career
Dave graduated from Bay High School and attended Ohio University, where he led the Bobcats and the Mid-American Conference in punting for four straight years. As a senior, Zastudil was selected as a first-team All-American by Football News and the Football Writers Association of America, and was selected as a second-team All-American by the Associated Press. He was also a first-team All-Mid-American Conference selection and the MAC's special teams co-player of the year, after leading the MAC in punting four times. During his senior year, Zastudil punted 50 times for 2,280 yards with a 45.6-yard average, with 16 of those punts having come from inside the 20-yard line, seven touchbacks and a long punt of 74 yards.

As an underclassman, Zastudil was a first-team All-Mid American Conference selection as a junior (averaging 44.3 yards per punt), sophomore (43.2 yards per punt) and freshman (45.3 yards per punt). As a sophomore, he was the MAC special teams player of the year and the first-team All-MAC punter after leading the conference in punting. As a freshman, he was also named to the All-America team.

Zastudil also set the school record for the longest punt with a 75-yard punt against the Akron Zips. Dave graduated from Ohio with a double major in finance and marketing.

Professional career

Baltimore Ravens
After graduating from Ohio University, Zastudil was eligible for the 2002 NFL Draft. He was one of only two punters taken during the draft (Craig Jarrett was the other), and was drafted in the fourth round with the 112th pick overall by the Baltimore Ravens.

Cleveland Browns

On March 12, 2006, Zastudil was signed by the Cleveland Browns to the terms of a five-year contract, replacing lackluster punter Kyle Richardson. Before 2009, Zastudil had played in all but three games during his professional career; he missed those three games in 2004 after suffering a shoulder injury.  On November 18, 2009 Zastudil was put on injured reserve after a lingering knee problem. Reggie Hodges took over the punting for the Browns.  The knee did not recover as well as expected after surgery, and Zastudil was placed on injured reserve again for the 2010 season on August 17, 2010.  On November 16, Zastudil and quarterback Brett Ratliff were waived by the Browns.

Arizona Cardinals
Zastudil signed with the Arizona Cardinals on August 24, 2011. In the 2012 season, Zastudil set the NFL record for most net punting yards in a season with 5,209. In addition, he had 46 punts land inside the 20-yard line, breaking the NFL single-season record, which was originally shared by three others. On August 31, 2015, Zastudil was released by the Cardinals.

Career statistics

Personal life
He is married to Sara Zastudil. The couple have 5 children. He currently resides in Bay Village, Ohio.

References

External links

1978 births
Living people
People from Bay Village, Ohio
Players of American football from Ohio
American football punters
Ohio Bobcats football players
Baltimore Ravens players
Cleveland Browns players
Arizona Cardinals players